Yun Waddy Lwin Moe (born 21 October 1998) is a Burmese model and actress. She has appeared as a runway model in several fashion shows in Myanmar. She was appointed as an UNICEF Youth Ambassador in 2017. Since 2015 she walking the runway at the Myanmar International Fashion Week.  She made her big-screen debut with the drama film Shwe Phoo Ser, alongside Paing Takhon, Kaung Myat San and Phway Phway. She has appeared in over 50 TV commercial advertisements including Canmake, Kanebo, OPPO, Daisy Cotton, Pureen, Ovaltine, Alpine, Sein Nandaw, She Shines and Unique Clothing, etc.

Personal life
Yun Waddy Lwin Moe was born on 21 October 1998 in Yangon. She is the eldest daughter of actor Lwin Moe and May Thu. She has one younger sibling Yun Nandi Lwin Moe. 

She married Htet Oo Hlaing on 4 January 2018. She gave birth to their first son Lwin Htet on 7 August 2018.

References

External links 

1998 births
Living people
21st-century Burmese actresses
Burmese female models
People from Yangon